Six ships of the Royal Navy have been named HMS Circe, after the Greek goddess Circe.

 The first  was a 28-gun sixth rate launched in 1785 and wrecked in 1803.
 The second  was a 32-gun fifth rate launched in 1804 and sold in 1814.
 The third  was a 46-gun fifth rate launched in 1827, confined to harbour service in 1866, renamed HMS Impregnable in 1916 and sold 1922.
 The fourth  was a torpedo gunboat in service from 1892 to 1920.
 The sixth  was a minesweeper launched in 1942 and broken up 1967.

Royal Navy ship names